Ursula Münzer-Linder (born 25 July 1922) is a German classical violinist.

Life 
Linder was born in Bremerhaven in 1922. After attending the secondary school in her home town, she received violin lessons from Carl Berla in Bremen until 1939. She then studied violin with Gustav Havemann, Max Strub and Jost Raba at the Berlin University of the Arts.

From 1941 to 1945, she was a violinist in Fritz Stein's chamber orchestra. After the Second World War, she gave chamber concerts in Bremerhaven and made recordings for Radio Bremen. In 1952, she became 1st violinist at the Musikgesellschaft Bremerhaven.

In 1946, she married the Kapellmeister Hans Linder.

Further reading 
 Adrian Gaster (ed.): International Who’s who in Music and Musicians’ Directory. 8th edition, Melrose Press, Cambridge, 1977, .
 Hedwig and Erich Hermann Mueller von Asow (ed.): Kürschners Handbücher Musiker-Kalender 1954. 2nd edition of the Deutsches Musiker-Lexikon, de Gruyter, Berlin 1954, Sp. 878.

References 

German classical violinists
Women classical violinists
1922 births
Living people
People from Bremerhaven